Milionerzy (Millionaires) is a Polish game show based on the original British format of Who Wants to Be a Millionaire? The show is hosted by Hubert Urbański. The main goal of the game is to win 1 million Polish zloty by answering twelve multiple-choice questions correctly. There are three basic lifelines - fifty fifty (pół na pół, 50:50), phone a friend (telefon do przyjaciela) and ask the audience (pytanie do publiczności); and also two other lifelines - ask the expert (pytanie do eksperta) and switch the question (zamiana pytania). From March to December 2010 contestant could choose risk game, where the second guaranteed sum (40,000 zł) was not guaranteed. The first series of Milionerzy was broadcast from 3 September 1999 to 26 January 2003, the second version was broadcast from 19 January 2008 to 19 December 2010, and the third version has been broadcast since 9 February 2017. Currently, it is shown every Monday to Thursday at 8:55 p.m (CET +1 or CEST +2) on the Polish commercial television station TVN. The executive producer of the programme was Endemol in the first version, Intergalactic in the second version, and Jake Vision in the third version. Since 2008, when a contestant gets the second question correct, they will leave with 1,000 zł. When a contestant gets the seventh question correct, they will leave with 40,000 zł.

The game's prizes 
In the first version of Milionerzy, there were fifteen questions:

In the second and third versions of Milionerzy, there were twelve questions:

Appearance and changes of appearance 
From 1999 through 2003 we could see three changes of the studio stage design, some differ in stylistics. From 2008, after resumption we could see the fourth stage design and now, in 2010, the fifth one.

The first logo of Milionerzy from 1999 was very different from the standard model used in other editions of Who Wants to Be a Millionaire?. It was a violet rhombus on one of vertexes and rings standing on themselves on background of "Milionerzy" caption. The second one, modelled on the traditional style, is round with green question marks. It was introduced with the changes of credits and scenography in 2000. It is used also now, but in another colour scheme (question marks are gold).

The first and second version of the opening credits were similar with people looking and aiming on Milionerzy logo. It was patterned on British credits of this time. From 2008, the opening credits of the programme feature an animation showing in sequence all prizes to one million zlotys – it is patterned on the newest British version.

In 2008 except for the opening credits, no big changes were made on graphics and sounds. The 2008 edition had refreshed graphics: the fields with questions and answers were navy-blue and blue (earlier black) and smaller than in first edition of Milionerzy, and the field with won prize was blue (earlier brown and navy-blue). Also some sound effects and music we could hear in the background when player answers a question, changed.

In 2010 opening credits were changed, fields, where players' names are shown in Fastest Finger First are smaller, question fields and money tree are smaller, also fonts were changed. Also, there are no commercial break intros and outros.

Now (since February 2017), the show is recorded in Farat Film studio in Warsaw, 22, Notecka St. The first edition was recorded in the Warsaw-based WFDiF studio, 21, Chełmska St. from 1999 until 2001 in the TVP studio on 17, Woronicza St until 2003. In 2008 and 2009 Milionerzy was recorded in the TVP studio in Kraków, 44, Nowohucka St.

Light effects during second edition (2008-2010)
Scenography of the second edition (2008–2010). Studio has these light effects:

Way to become a contestant 
1999–2003

 Stage I – to become a contestant, you had to phone a special Telemedium number, then choose date of recording of the episode, then answer a question with four variants and tell your personal details. 100 people were drawn from those who answered correctly and told the same recording date and they went to the II stage.
 Stage II – people, who were drawn, gave their telephone number, and a pollster called them in a 2-days time and asked questions, which didn't have answer variants. 20 people, who gave the most similar answers to the correct ones were going to the III stage.
 Stage III – before the recording participants had to arrange answer variants in correct order. 12 people, who did it correctly went to the IV stage. They were 10 Fastest Finger First players and two reserves. Pollster phoned them to confirm that they participate.

2008–2010

 Stage I – to become a contestant, you had to send a SMS with Milion text to a shown number, and then answer two questions with four answer variants sent by a SMS and to give your personal details. The first 100 people who registered, answered those 2 questions and gave their personal details, went to the second stage.
 Stage II – agent of the producer of the program phoned those 100 people. The call is recorded, about what those people are informed at the beginning of the call. Potential participant has to say about him, his hobby, job etc. Next, he had to answer several general knowledge questions, which don't have variants. People chosen in the phone casting are informed about it in a 7-days time and invited to the studio.

The highest prizes by episodes 
Legend:
number of episode • broadcast date; took consideration to prizes of 40,000 zł or more

2008

2009

2010

Notable contestants

Third edition

1,000,000 złotys winners
Maria Romanek – 21 March 2018
Katarzyna Kant-Wysocka – 14 March 2019
Jacek Iwaszko – 23 September 2021
Tomasz Orzechowski – 19 September 2022

1,000,000 złotys question wrong (lost 460,000 złotys)
Dawid Michalewski – 5 October 2020

500,000 złotys winners
Sonia Ciuk – 15 March 2017
Kinga Rusin & Piotr Kraśko – 15 April 2017 (Celebrity Edition, used Phone a Friend lifeline in the final question)
Remigiusz Skubisz – 16 October 2017 (used Ask the Audience lifeline in the final question)
Zbigniew Zamachowski & Borys Szyc – 7 December 2017 (Celebrity Edition)
Dominik Komorek – 10 September 2018 (used Phone a Friend and Ask the Audience lifeline in the final question)
Maksymilian Bilewicz – 4 March 2019
Marcin Kot – 16 March 2020
Łukasz Grymuza – 22 October 2020
Maciej Adamski – 16 November 2020
Mikołaj Masłowski – 2 December 2020
Maciej Mędrzycki – 7 April 2022
Przemysław Zieliński – 21 April 2022
Małgorzata Rozenek-Majdan & Krzysztof Skórzyński – 3 October 2022 (Celebrity 25th Anniversary TVN Special)

500,000 złotys question wrong (lost 210,000 złotys)
Joanna Stroczkowska – 22 February 2017
Wojciech Zaręba – 27 September 2017
Wojciech Czubak – 19 February 2018
Aleksandra Burdka – 4 April 2018
Katarzyna Wincza & Lena Pachuc – 5 December 2019 (Saint Nicholas Day Special)
Anna Serzysko – 27 October 2020
Sabina Pecio – 25 March 2021
Konrad Jurgiewicz – 16 September 2021
Michał Tadeusz Koziej – 28 September 2021
Łukasz Zdrojkowski – 14 March 2022

250,000 złotys winners
Jakub Rudnicki – 8 March 2017
Katarzyna Kołaczkowska – 29 March 2017
Ilona Rasińska – 12 April 2017
Alicja Bańczyk – 14 September 2017
Agnieszka Dachterska – 25 October 2017
Maciej Krawiec – 8 November 2017
Hanna Czapla – 21 February 2018
Magdalena Rybicka – 27 March 2018
Andrzej Gręziak – 28 March 2018
Bartosz Kołecki – 18 April 2018
Łukasz Półrolniczak – 25 April 2018
Tomasz Otręba – 5 September 2018
Judyta Perczak – 3 December 2018
Anna Cichosz – 26 February 2019
Joanna Liszowska & Tomasz Sapryk – 21 March 2019 (Celebrity Special)
Bartłomiej Marcjaniak – 25 April 2019
Joanna Szczudlik-Kowalczyk – 3 September 2019
Ewa Kamarad – 4 September 2019
Filip Olszówka – 12 September 2019
Dawid Tusiński – 26 September 2019
Dorota Rutkowska-Skwara – 16 October 2019
Zbigniew Górski – 23 October 2019
Agata Langowska – 29 October 2019
Jolanta Glinka-Kalisz – 14 November 2019
Mikołaj Wieczorek – 4 March 2020
Hanna Przydatek – 5 March 2020
Magdalena Ziółek – 11 March 2020
Marta Maszkiewicz – 12 October 2020
Jan Sękowski – 16 February 2021
Anna Wrona – 18 February 2021
Piotr Rutkowski – 26 April 2021
Marzena Szymanowska-Pietrzyk – 2 September 2021
Szymon Batura – 13 September 2021
Leszek Kędzierski – 11 October 2021
Bogdan Wójcik – 3 November 2021
Marek Kalus – 21 March 2022
Piotr Tyburski – 5 September 2022
Magdalena Wilczek – 29 September 2022
Rafał Rak – 17 October 2022
Jacek Borusiński & Wojciech Malajkat (Saint Nicolas Day Special) - 1 December 2022
Marta Kuligowska & Magdalena Cielecka (Women's Day Celebrity Special) - 7 March 2023

125,000 złotys winners
Mateusz Buczek – 21 February 2017
Beata Wodejko-Kucharska – 1 March 2017
Michał Kowalczewski – 22 March 2017
Katarzyna Romanek – 4 April 2017
Joanna Flasza – 6 April 2017
Konrad Janik – 6 April 2017
Karol Pietrowicz – 17 May 2017
Maciej Walewski – 19 September 2017
Mariusz Boheński – 2 October 2017
Jakub Pękala – 11 October 2017
Adam Fuchs – 18 October 2017
Magdalena Wiaterska – 15 November 2017
Szymon Wojtyra – 5 December 2017
Paweł Duda – 20 February 2018
Arkadiusz Skiba – 26 February 2018
Emilia Dadan – 28 February 2018
Weronika Zblewska – 12 March 2018
Justyna Męcik – 11 April 2018
Weronika Bujnowska – 3 September 2018
Wioletta Ryczek – 11 September 2018
Jacek Piątkowski – 17 September 2018
Agnieszka Nawrocka – 19 September 2018
Błażej Szulc – 7 November 2018
Wojciech Lipiński – 13 November 2018
Tomasz Remian – 15 November 2018
Damian Zieliński – 18 April 2019
Błażej Krzywicki – 13 May 2019
Jarosław Hirny-Budka – 23 May 2019
Mirosława Obst – 8 October 2019
Piotr Maćkowiak – 24 October 2019
Paweł Jokiel – 31 October 2019
Karol Filczak – 7 November 2019
Marek Muszyński – 11 November 2019
Mirosław Kobus – 21 November 2019
Szymon Jankowski – 27 November 2019
Adrian Pietrzak – 26 March 2020
Sebastian Zasada – 10 September 2020
Filip Wołowski – 24 September 2020
Paweł Goleniowski – 6 October 2020
Hanna Janus – 5 November 2020
Filip Dawidowicz – 10 November 2020
Paulina Krupińska & Damian Michałowski – 3 December 2020 (Saint Nicolas Day Celebrity Special)
Jerzy Kuhn – 2 March 2021
Andrzej Grabowski – 24 March 2021
Przemysław Dąbek – 30 September 2021
Michał Ślusarz – 21 October 2021
Sebastian Kusz – 25 November 2021
Emil Witczak – 30 November 2021
Marcin Wojciechowski – 1 December 2021
Jan Steinmetz – 3 March 2022
Sebastian Jurgielewicz – 5 May 2022
Łukasz Wesołowski – 11 May 2022
Monika Zega – 7 September 2022
Jakub Maj – 12 September 2022
Marek Sławik - 9 November 2022
Agnieszka Suchora & Agata Kulesza (Women's Day Special) - 7 March 2023

Second edition

1,000,000 złotys winners
Krzysztof Wójcik – 28 March 2010

500,000 złotys winners
Paulina Kowalczyk – 5 April 2008 (used 50:50 and Ask the Audience lifeline in the final question)
Dagna Sieńko – 18 May 2008
Rafał Tomański – 22 November 2008 (used 50:50 and Ask the Audience lifeline in the final question)
Renata Dancewicz & Piotr Adamczyk – 7 December 2008 (Celebrity Edition, used 50:50 lifeline in the final question)
Marzena Rogowska – 25 April 2009
Katarzyna Zaręba – 24 October 2010
Karolina Korwin-Piotrowska & Michał Piróg – 19 December 2010 (Celebrity Edition)
Four players guessed the correct answer after resigning from playing.

500,000 złotys question wrong (lost 210,000 złotys)
Sławomir Kucharczyk – 6 April 2008
Lidia Wołk-Karaczewska – 14 March 2009
Dorota Śliwak – 19 September 2010

250,000 złotys winners
Elżbieta Orłowska – 29 March 2008 (used Phone a Friend and Ask the Audience lifelines in 500,000 złotys question)
Dorota Kwiecińska – 27 April 2008
Marek Kraśnicki – 7 September 2008 (used Phone a Friend lifeline in 500,000 złotys question)
Marcin Bobrowski – 19 April 2009
Tomasz Radko – 1 November 2009
Szymon Hołownia & Marcin Prokop – 26 December 2009 (Celebrity Edition)
Jakub Tomys – 2 May 2010
Jędrzej Wiczkowski – 20 June 2010
Magdalena Lula – 10 October 2010

125,000 złotys winners
Elżbieta Sokołowska – 27 January 2008
Paweł Staszyński – 10 February 2008
Joanna Słowińska – 17 May 2008
Ewa Drzyzga & Szymon Majewski – 1 June 2008 (Celebrity Edition)
Małgorzata Czepek – 7 June 2008
Waldemar Kazimierski – 6 September 2008
Wojciech Przybyłowicz – 25 October 2008
Weronika Bielacha – 29 March 2009
Sławomir Chromik – 10 May 2009
Jolanta Falcman – 20 September 2009
Artur Szczęsny – 18 October 2009
Sebastian Rzodkiewicz – 4 April 2010
Łukasz Weber – 25 April 2010
Kajetan Pawełczyk – 16 May 2010
Mikołaj Dulęba – 7 November 2010
Maciej Piszcz – 21 November 2010

First edition

1,000,000 złotys question wrong (lost 468,000 złotys)
Filip Łapiński – 2 June 2002 (special edition with participation of children, used 50:50 lifeline in the final question)

500,000 złotys winners
Władysław Kostrzewski – 21 October 2000 (first contestant to walk away with 500,000 złotys)
Zbigniew Chrzanowski – 21 May 2001
Jerzy Mirski – 14 October 2001
All three players guessed the correct answer after resigning from playing.

500,000 złotys question wrong (lost 218,000 złotys)
Leszek Musiał – 29 December 2000
Andrzej Bibel – 30 September 2001
Renata Dancewicz & Paweł Wilczak – 24 December 2001 (Celebrity Edition)
Waldemar Myszkiewicz – 5 January 2002
Krzysztof Paliński – 3 March 2002
Ziemowit Stefański – 2 June 2002 (special edition with participation of children)

250,000 złotys winners
Krzysztof Karwowski – 5 March 2000
Jarosław Olejnicki – 5 May 2000
Marek Janowski – 8 October 2000
Stanisław Pietrasiewicz – 17 February 2001
Katarzyna Dobras – 28 February 2001
Jerzy Zadrożny – 12 March 2001
Tomasz Micorek – 24 September 2001
Artur Wiśniewski – 16 December 2001
Edyta Olszówka & Olaf Lubaszenko – 25 December 2001 (Celebrity Edition)
Szczepan Gardecki – 9 February 2002
Gogoł family – 23 September 2002 (Family Edition)
Aleksandra Woźniak & Rafał Królikowski – 25 December 2002 (Celebrity Edition)

125,000 złotys winners 
Andrzej Zubala – 17 September 1999
Bogdan Rzepka – 24 September 1999
Barbara Płachta – 27 November 1999
Katarzyna Niziałek – 31 December 1999
Grażyna Tomaszewska – 3 January 2000
Maciej Kondratowicz – 12 March 2000
Paweł Wasilewski – 18 March 2000
Alfred Znamierowski – 16 April 2000
Marzena Bralska – 29 April 2000
Łukasz Kaźmierczak – 30 April 2000
Ryszard Ćwirta – 14 May 2000
Katarzyna Kreczmer – 29 May 2000
Bogdan Wencel – 21 June 2000
Bożena Pieczara – 28 June 2000
Grażyna Eysmont – 2 September 2000
Edward Mierzwa – 2 September 2000
Marek Pawlak – 8 September 2000
Tadeusz Biały – 9 September 2000
Piotr Kopczyński – 30 September 2000
Tomasz Guzek – 4 October 2000
Wojciech Chocianowski – 25 November 2000
Marek Duszczyk – 9 December 2000
Mariusz Jaszczuk – 15 December 2000
Jan Mika – 1 January 2001
Mieczysław Kulesza – 14 January 2001
Marcin Grzelak – 22 January 2001
Przemysław Radowicz – 11 February 2001
Barbara ? & Mirosław ? – 14 February 2001
Tadeusz Grabowski – 11 March 2001
Tomasz Lipiński – 19 March 2001
Mariusz Kowalski – 7 April 2001
Arkadiusz Jadacki – 14 April 2001
Marek Fotek – 23 April 2001
Wiesław Czekaj – 4 May 2001
Stojan Nedalkov – 6 May 2001
Zbigniew Męcik – 17 June 2001
Andrzej Łukaszczyk – 30 June 2001
Monika Żuczkowska – 22 October 2001
Jacek Branas – 19 November 2001
Joanna Dymczyk – 24 November 2001
Andrzej Kamiński – 3 December 2001
Henryk Bronner – 30 December 2001
Ewa Wota – 6 January 2002
Maciej Krawczyński – 13 January 2002
Henryk Czarny – 3 February 2002
Piotr Bednarczyk – 10 March 2002
Marek Piłat – 16 March 2002
Katarzyna Skrzynecka & Maciej Kozłowski – ? April 2002 (Celebrity Edition)
Artur Barciś & Cezary Żak – ? April 2002 (Celebrity Edition)
Witold Myśliwiec – 6 April 2002
Andrzej Wardyn – 27 April 2002
Mirosław Monczyński – 29 April 2002
Monika Brochacka & Piotr Borucki – ? June 2002 (Big Brother Edition)
Tomasz Derda – 20 October 2002
Józef Mieluch – 10 November 2002
Jerzy Pasternak – 2 December 2002
Krzysztof Bendkowski – 16 December 2002
Agnieszka Stachurska – 26 January 2003

Statistics

Special episodes

1999–2003
 In February 2001, issued the first edition of a special game show. These were episodes of Valentine's Day, which was attended by couples in love.
 Between 24 and 26 December 2001 issued a charitable Millionaire edition to celebrate Christmas. The participants were eight actors that played their game in the following pairs: Renata Dancewicz & Paweł Wilczak, Edyta Olszówka & Olaf Lubaszenko, Agnieszka Warchulska & Zbigniew Zamachowski and Małgorzata Kożuchowska & Maciej Stuhr. The total amount won was the whole issue of 375,000 złotys, which is devoted to the foundation TVN Nie jesteś sam.
 The Easter episode of the show was broadcast on the turn of March and April 2002. Pairs of actors participated in the show: Artur Barciś with Cezary Żak, Katarzyna Skrzynecka with Maciej Kozłowski and Anna Przybylska with Robert Gonera. All winnings summed up were 314,000 złotys. The winnings were given to charity TVN Nie jesteś sam (You aren't alone).
 On Children's Day there were two special episodes, were shown on 1 and 2 June 2002, the prizes were given to the TVN charity. The participants were children attending primary schools. The prizes were the same as in usual episodes, but the questions were easier. Amount of money won in those episode was 64,000 złotys.
 On 29 and 30 June there were special episodes where participants were people from Polish Big Brother. Players were playing in pairs: Monika Sewioło with Piotr Gulczyński, Ilona Stachura with Arkadiusz Nowakowski, Monika Brochacka with Piotr Borucki, Agnieszka Frykowska with Łukasz Wiewiórski, Alicja Walczak with Sebastian Florek and Karolina Jakubik with Wojciech Glanc. Winnings were given to Nie jesteś sam charity.
 Latest special edition episodes of the first version of Milionerzy was shown during Christmas time in 2002. The participants were: Aleksandra Woźniak & Rafał Królikowski, Grażyna Wolszczak & Andrzej Zieliński and Joanna Brodzik & Paweł Wilczak. The total amount of money won was donated to the TVN foundation Nie jesteś sam.

Also in 2002 TVN was broadcasting series of family episodes. Teams of three people were taking part, and all had to be related. Every team had its captain. The rules were the same as in normal episodes, but the captain decided about choosing an answer after consultations with the rest of family members. After winning 32,000 złotys, one person left the team and went to the audience; after winning 125,000 złotys another person left and only one person left had to answer last three questions. Najwyższa wygrana w tych wydaniach to 250 000 złotych.

2008–2010
 On 1 June 2008 (Children's Day) episode celebrities of Polish television were playing for money to build a cancer prevention center. The first pair of players were Piotr Gąsowski and Katarzyna Skrzynecka who won 40,000 złotys, and the second pair of players were Szymon Majewski and Ewa Drzyzga who won 125,000 złotys. Whole amount of money won was given to the Nie jesteś sam charity.
 Next episodes were broadcasteon 6 and 7 December 2008. In the first episode, Kinga Rusin and Bartosz Węglarczyk won 40,000 złotys, and in the second, Renata Dancewicz and Piotr Adamczyk won 500,000 złotys. The winnings were given to Nie jesteś sam charity.
 Next episodes were broadcast on 25 and 26 December 2009. On the first day, Julia Kamińska and Filip Bobek won 40,000 złotys. On the second day, Marcin Prokop and Szymon Hołownia won 250,000 złotys. All of the winnings were given to Nie jesteś sam charity.
In 2010, special episodes were broadcast on 12 and 19 December. In the first episode, Karolina Korwin-Piotrowska and Michał Piróg won 500,000 złotys, and on the next episode (broadcast on 19 December) they didn't answer the final question for 1 million zł. Next contestants were Anita Werner and Grzegorz Kajdanowicz – they won 40,000 zlotys. Winnings were to given to Nie jesteś sam charity.

2017 onwards
In 2020, there was a special edition related with Santa Claus that aired on 3 December. Winnings were given to the Nie jesteś sam charity.

Broadcasting

Number of viewers 

The biggest number of viewers was on 5 March 2000, when a contestant won 250,000 zł as the first person in the show. The number of viewers of this episode was 6.51 million people.

Average number of viewers of the January 2008–April 2008 episode was 3.5 million viewers. First episode of 2008 series (19 January 2008) was watched by 3.5 million viewers. The biggest number of viewers in 2008 series was on 5 April 2008, when the 1,000,000 zł question came up the first time in the 2008 series. The episode from 6 April 2008 in which contestant got the 500,000 zł question wrong was watched by 4.2 million viewers.

Questions for million złotys 
In Milionerzy, 30 questions for one million złotys appeared. 23 players walked away, and seven players answered the question. Two players answered incorrectly, while five players answered correctly and won 1 million złotys. Here are the questions:

Władysław Kostrzewski – 21 October 2000 (resigned)

Zbigniew Chrzanowski – 21 May 2001 (resigned)

Jerzy Mirski – 14 October 2001 (resigned)

Filip Łapiński – 2 June 2002 (special edition with participation of children; gave a wrong answer)

Paulina Kowalczyk – 5 April 2008 (resigned)

Dagna Sieńko – 18 May 2008 (resigned)

Rafał Tomański – 22 November 2008 (resigned)

 Renata Dancewicz and Piotr Adamczyk – 7 December 2008 (Celebrity Edition; resigned)

Marzena Rogowska – 25 April 2009 (resigned)

 Krzysztof Wójcik – 28 March 2010 (gave a right answer)

 Katarzyna Zaręba – 24 October 2010 (resigned)

 Karolina Korwin-Piotrowska and Michał Piróg – 19 December 2010 (Celebrity Edition; resigned)

Sonia Ciuk – 15 March 2017 (resigned)

Kinga Rusin and Piotr Kraśko – 15 April 2017 (Celebrity Edition; resigned)

Remigiusz Skubisz – 16 October 2017 (resigned)

Zbigniew Zamachowski and Borys Szyc – 7 December 2017 (Celebrity Edition; resigned)

Maria Romanek – 21 March 2018 (gave a right answer)

Dominik Komorek – 10 September 2018 (resigned)

Maksymilian Bilewicz – 4 March 2019 (resigned)

Katarzyna Kant-Wysocka – 14 March 2019 (gave a right answer)

Marcin Kot – 16 March 2020 (resigned)

Dawid Michalewski – 5 October 2020 (gave a wrong answer)

Łukasz Grymuza – 22 October 2020 (resigned)

Maciej Adamski – 16 November 2020 (resigned)

Mikołaj Masłowski – 2 December 2020 (resigned)

Jacek Iwaszko – 23 September 2021 (gave a right answer)

Maciej Mędrzycki – 7 April 2022 (resigned)

Przemysław Zieliński – 21 April 2022 (resigned)

Tomasz Orzechowski – 19 September 2022 (gave a right answer)

Małgorzata Rozenek-Majdan and Krzysztof Skórzyński – 3 October 2022 (Celebrity Edition; resigned)

Records and faux pas
 During the Fastest Fingers First portion in the second season, all contestants correctly answered the question, which was "Put these Australian towns in the alphabetical order". It is rare to see all contestants get the correct order.

 There has been an occasion similar to the American version where the audience unanimously voted on a single answer when asked for help via the Ask the Audience lifeline. The question, worth 40,000 złoty, was: "A small, golden gramophone is given away at what awards ceremony?" The correct answer was "Grammy Awards".

 The furthest a player has ever gone without using a single lifeline was 125,000 złoty. The player went on to win 500,000 złoty. (See the Questions for million złotys and The highest prizes by episodes for more information.)

In Milionerzy there were three situations when player lost because of laxly said questions and were restored to play.
 The first player made a mistake in the question for 32,000 zł: "Who invented the steam engine?". He answered "James Watt", but the correct answer was "Charles Algernon Parsons". After a complaint to programme's producer, his answer was recognized as correct. The player won a guaranteed 32,000 zł, but he answered incorrectly in the next question for 64,000 zł.
 The second player made a mistake in the question for 500 zł: "How many cuts are on Kaiser rolls?". He answered: "4" (the correct answer was "5") and he won nothing. After recognizing his answer, he answered incorrectly in the question for 1000 zł and he left the studio without nothing for the second time.
 The third player on the question about the author of the picture The Luncheon on the Grass answered Claude Monet, but the correct answer was Édouard Manet. But Monet also painted a less known picture with the same title, so the player was allowed to continue playing.

Notes

References

Who Wants to Be a Millionaire?
Polish game shows
Television shows set in Warsaw
Television shows set in Kraków
1999 Polish television series debuts
2003 Polish television series endings
2008 Polish television series debuts
2010 Polish television series endings
TVN (Polish TV channel) original programming